Bellator 267: Lima vs. MVP 2 was a mixed martial arts event produced by Bellator MMA that took place on October 1, 2021, at Wembley Arena in London, England.

Background 
Former three-time champion Douglas Lima returned to the cage for the first time since losing his title to Yaroslav Amosov, when he faced Michael "Venom" Page in a rematch at SSE Arena in London. The main card of the event, titled "Bellator London: Lima vs. MVP 2," aired live at 4 p.m. ET on Showtime. Page returned to fight in his home city for the first time since 2019, looking to avenge the lone defeat of his professional career when he was knocked out by Lima in the second round of their Bellator Welterweight World Grand Prix semifinal bout two years ago at Bellator 221.

The co-main event featured #5 ranked Featherweight Leah McCourt against Jessica Borga.

A lightweight bout between Charlie Leary and Gavin Hughes was scheduled for this event; however Hughes pulled out due to a ruptured bicep and was replaced by Benjamin Brander. At weigh ins, the bout was scrapped for COVID protocol issues.

Results

See also 

 2021 in Bellator MMA
 List of Bellator MMA events
 List of current Bellator fighters
 Bellator MMA Rankings

References 

Bellator MMA events
2021 in mixed martial arts
2021 in English sport
Mixed martial arts in the United Kingdom
Sports competitions in England